Phyllosticta lentisci is a fungal plant pathogen infecting pistachio.

References

External links
USDA ARS Fungal Database

Fungal plant pathogens and diseases
Fruit tree diseases
lentisci
Fungi described in 1913